Louis R. Eisenberg (born 1876 – died ?) was a Ukrainian-American chess master.

He was born in Odessa in 1876. After graduating from Nicholas College, he pursued journalism until, in 1901-1902, he won a chess tournament at Odessa 1901, and journeyed to Monte Carlo to participate in the international masters’ tournament played there under the auspices of the Cercle des Etrangers in 1902. He gave quick coverage of this tournament in Odesskiya Novosti.
Eisenberg took 18th place, although his victory on this occasion over Harry Nelson Pillsbury was his best effort. The event was won by Géza Maróczy.

Coming from within a few hours ride of Kishinev, after anti-Semitic Kishinev pogrom on 6–7 April 1903, he had decided to emigrate to the United States. The August 16, 1903 New York Tribune wrote that "Louis R. Eisenberg (..) who recently played for Chicago in the telegraphic match against the Brooklyn Chess Club has made Pittsburg his home." He also played 
in matches  Chicago CC vs. Twin Cities CC in 1904, and Brooklyn CC vs. Rice CC New York in 1909.

Eisenberg shared 5th at St. Louis 1904 (the 7th American Chess Congress, Frank James Marshall won). He participated in the New York State Chess Association championship in 1909, finishing in a three-way tie for first with Clarence S. Howell and H. Zirn. The three had a playoff and Howell won. This and a game against José Raúl Capablanca which was played in New York City indicate that Eisenberg was probably living there in 1909.

References

External links
Louis Eisenberg at 365Chess.com

1876 births
Ukrainian Jews
American people of Ukrainian-Jewish descent
Ukrainian chess players
American chess players
Jewish chess players
Sportspeople from Odesa
Year of death missing
Emigrants from the Russian Empire to the United States
Chess players from the Russian Empire